Dama may refer to:

A dialect of the Khoekhoe language spoken by the Damara people
Dama language (Cameroon), possibly a dialect of Mono
Dama language (Sierra Leone), extinct and unclassified